The Environmental Film Festival Australia is a film festival which screens domestically and internationally produced environmental films around Australia.

History 
The festival launched in 2010 as the Environmental Film Festival Melbourne and has been held annually since. In 2015, the festival changed its name to reflect its intention to expand and held additional screenings in Canberra and Hobart. In 2016 the festival presented screenings in Melbourne, Sydney, Canberra, Adelaide and Hobart. In 2017 the festival presented screenings in Melbourne and Canberra. In 2018 the festival will present screenings in Melbourne.

Governance 
The festival is a 100% volunteer-run organisation. The current director is Nathan Senn. Previous directors were Brooke Daly and Chris Gerbing.

Supporters 
In 2015, the festival's patrons were Bob Brown, Linh Do, Adam Bandt and filmmaker, Heidi Douglas.

References 

Film festivals established in 2010
Film festivals in Melbourne
Environmental film festivals
Environmentalism in Australia
Documentary film festivals in Australia